R. L. Sullivan was an American football and basketball coach.  He served as the head football coach at the University of Mississippi (Ole Miss) from 1919 to 1921, and compiled a record of 11–13. Sullivan was also the head basketball coach at Mississippi from 1919 to 1925, and compiled a record of 66–32.

Head coaching record

Football

References

Year of birth missing
Year of death missing
Ole Miss Rebels football coaches
Ole Miss Rebels men's basketball coaches